Victor Său (born 18 March 1971) is a politician from the Republic of Moldova. He served as mayor of Soroca between 2007 and 2011 and for the second time between 2015 and 2019. He is the leader of Liberal Democratic Party of Moldova in Soroca.

He was elected as a mayor of Soroca in 2007 Moldovan local election, when was a leader of the National Liberal Party (Moldova).

References

External links 
 Conducerea Primariei
 True Moldova

1971 births
People from Soroca District
Mayors of places in Moldova
People from Soroca
Liberal Democratic Party of Moldova politicians
Moldovan jurists
Moldovan engineers
National Liberal Party (Moldova) politicians
Living people